Eero Emil Kössi Salo (4 July 1921, Hämeenlinna – 13 October 1975) was a Finnish politician. He was a Member of the Parliament of Finland from 1968 until his death in 1975, representing the Social Democratic Party of Finland (SDP).

References

1921 births
1975 deaths
People from Hämeenlinna
Social Democratic Party of Finland politicians
Members of the Parliament of Finland (1966–70)
Members of the Parliament of Finland (1970–72)
Members of the Parliament of Finland (1972–75)
Members of the Parliament of Finland (1975–79)